Myslovitz is a debut studio album by Polish alternative rock band Myslovitz, released in 1995. It contains 11 tracks. The album is clearly divided into two parts. The first 6 tracks are melodious pop-rock compositions, the next are mostly psychedelic ballads. In many moments the vocal is two-part. The album begins Myslovitz's career in the Polish field of music.

Track listing 

All music and lyrics by Myslovitz, except track 5 (lyrics Marek Jałowiecki) and track 10 (lyrics Marcin Porczek)
 "Kobieta" (Woman)
 "Papierowe Skrzydła" (Paper Wings)
 "Myslovitz"
 "Zgon" (Death)
 "Przedtem" (Before)
 "Krótka Piosenka o Miłości" (A Short Song About Love)
 "Maj" (May)
 "Wyznanie" (Confession)
 "Deszcz" (Rain)
 "Good Day My Angel"
 "Moving Revolution"

Singles 

 1995 Myslovitz
 1995 Zgon (Death)
 1995 Krótka Piosenka o Miłości (A Short Song About Love)
 1996 Maj (May)

Re-editions 

2002 "Best Of The Best Gold"
2005 "Myslovitz" (remaster) with additional tracks:
12. Myslovitz - remix '95  (4:16)
13. Drive Blind (Ride cover)  (4:15)
14. Blue Velvet - live '96  (3:00)

Personnel 

Myslovitz:
 Artur Rojek - lead vocal, guitars
 Wojciech Powaga - guitars
 Jacek Kuderski - bass guitar, backing vocals
 Wojciech Kuderski - drums

and also:
 Andrzej Smolik - keyboards
 Andrzej Zachary - trumpet
 Ian Harris - producer, recording
 Michał Targowski - recording
 Sławomir Jurek - artwork

Myslovitz albums
1995 debut albums